Di'haii Gwich'in (translation: "Gwich'in living the farthest away" or "those living farthest downstream") are a small Gwichʼin tribe of the Athabaskan linguistic stock. Descendants intermarried with the Neets'aii Gwich'in in Arctic Village, Alaska, USA. Historically they occupied the north fork of the Chandalar River, and the Middle and South Forks of the Koyukuk River.

References
 Ernest S. Burch Jr. and Craig Mishler, "The Di'haii Gwich'in: Mystery People of Northern Alaska". Arctic Anthropology 32(1):147-172 (1995).

Gwich'in